Tashiding is a small town on a hilltop at West District of Sikkim in the Eastern Himalaya of India. Tashiding means "The Devoted Central Glory". This village is about 250 m above sea level with a sub-tropical climate. It is around 40 kilometer far away from district headquarter of Gyalshing. In electoral roll of 2011, Tashiding comes under the Assembly Constituency of Yuksom-Tashiding.

Etymology
The legends of the village says that the name Tashiding means "The Devoted Central Glory". It represents the Nyingmapa order of Tibetan Buddhism and has been a center of worship in the Kingdom of Sikkim since the 1700s.

Population composition
In Tashiding village, most of the village population is from Schedule Tribe (ST). Schedule Tribe (ST) constitutes 51.76% while Schedule Caste (SC) were 13.67% of total population in Tashiding village.

Tashiding data
According to the 2011 Census, Tashiding data are as under:

Work profile
In Tashiding village out of total population, 650 were engaged in work activities. 95.85% of workers describe their work as Main Work (Employment or Earning more than 6 Months) while 4.15% were involved in Marginal activity providing livelihood for less than 6 months. Of 650 workers engaged in Main Work, 389 were cultivators (owner or co-owner) while 56 were Agricultural labourer.

References

Villages in Gyalshing district